André Borie (died 1971) was a French civil engineer who was involved in many public construction projects of the French state and helped to build part of the Mont Blanc tunnel. He was president of the Entrepreneurs de travaux publics who awarded a medal in his honour. He is said to have been an art collector and to have left his paintings to his daughter Andrée Borie.

See also
Giulano Ruffini

References 

1971 deaths
French civil engineers
Chevaliers of the Légion d'honneur
Year of birth missing
French businesspeople